The International DuraStar (originally introduced as the International 4000 series), is a product line of medium-duty trucks produced by Navistar International from 2001 to 2018.  Introduced as the successor to the International 4000 series of 1989–2001, the 4000 series was renamed the DuraStar in 2008.  Developed as a Class 6-7 product range, the 4000/DuraStar was slotted below the 8000/TranStar regional-haul semitractor, with the Class 5 International TerraStar (2010–2015) serving as the smallest International conventional-cab product range.

The most distinctive features of the DuraStar are the "crescent shape" headlights and a distinctive "black spot" on the left side of the cab. Produced as both a semitractor and a straight/rigid truck, the 4000/DuraStar has been used in a wide variety of applications, including emergency vehicles, towing, flatbed trucks, and cargo box trucks.  For bus use, the chassis is used in both cowled-chassis and cutaway-cab configurations for school bus and commercial applications.

For 2019 production, the International DuraStar underwent an extensive revision, becoming the International MV.

Blue Diamond Truck alliance 
From 2001 to 2009, Navistar medium-duty trucks were assembled as part of a joint venture with Ford Motor Company.  Named Blue Diamond Truck, LLC, the 50/50 joint venture between Ford and International developed medium-duty trucks for both companies assembled in a Navistar facility in General Escobedo, Mexico.

Upon a shared chassis, Ford and Navistar produced distinct cabs and interiors.  While Ford supplied its medium-duty Ford F-Series with Cummins and Caterpillar engines, the International 4000/DuraStar was (initially) supplied with International-designed diesel engines (DT, VT, MaxxForce).

In 2000, Ford introduced the medium-duty Ford F-Series (the F-650/F-750 Super Duty), with International introducing its 4000 series truck line in early 2001.

First generation (2001–2018) 

In February 2001, Navistar released its all-new 4000 series, dubbed as "High Performance Trucks".  Developed in the Blue Diamond Truck joint venture with Ford, the 4000 series marked the first completely new truck line from International since the 1979 S series.  Sharing its chassis with the medium-duty Ford F-Series (introduced in 2000), the International 4300/4400 retained the DT466 and DT530 diesels of their predecessors.  For versions equipped with automatic transmissions, electronics for the engine and transmissions were retuned to optimize throttle and shifting response, to increase both performance and fuel economy.  To increase forward visibility, the size of the windshield was increased by over 60%, with additional attention paid to improvements in ventilation.

At the launch of the 4000 series, the standard 4300 and higher-GVWR 4400 were introduced as replacements for the previous 4900 model series.  In 2002, the lower-GVWR 4200 was introduced as the replacement for the 4700 series, marking the introduction of the VT365 engine.  In 2006, the 4100 was introduced, expanding the model line into the Class 5 segment; the model was discontinued a single year of production.  The 4200, 4300, and 4400 were produced in both a standard and low-profile frame.  The 4400 was also produced in a semitractor; sitting 4 inches higher than the chassis truck, the 4400 tractor was the only version offered with the DT570 engine as an option.

Brand revision 
For 2008, coinciding with the introduction of the International ProStar and International LoneStar, Navistar revised the branding of its truck model lines.  In line with nomenclature previously used by International Harvester, truck lines adopted a "xxxxStar" naming scheme, with the 4000 series adopting the DuraStar model name.  This change was completed in its entirety for the 2010 model year. In another revision, to comply with 2007 emissions regulations, the powertrain lineup underwent extensive revision, with the 6.0L VT365 V8 replaced by the 6.4L MaxxForce 7 V8.  The DT inline-6 engine family underwent revisions as well, with the DT466 becoming the MaxxForce DT and the DT570 becoming the MaxxForce 9, adopting four-valve cylinder heads and exhaust gas recirculation to reduce emissions.  

While each International model series retained the use of numerical model codes, after the model revision, their usage was highly downplayed, largely relegated to places such as the build plate for the vehicle.  Externally, International replaced the numerical series and engine identification with script identifying the model series.

In 2010, the International TerraStar model line was introduced, effectively replacing the discontinued 4100 model line.  Sharing the cab of the DuraStar, the TerraStar sat on a lower frame and wore its own hood.

Powertrain revision 
For 2015 production, the DuraStar began to phase in Cummins ISB6.7 diesel engines as an option, slotted in between the MaxxForce 7 and MaxxForce DT, with the ISL as an option alongside the MaxxForce 9.  Although Cummins ISX engines had been offered in International Class 8 trucks, the expansion marked the introduction of the first selective catalytic reduction diesel engine for a medium-duty Navistar vehicle.

After 2016, Navistar ended production of the MaxxForce 7, MaxxForce DT, and MaxxForce 9 engines, with the ISB and ISL engines becoming the sole engine offerings of the DuraStar.

Second generation (International MV; 2019–2022) 

For 2019 model-year production, the medium-duty DuraStar product range underwent its most extensive revision since its 2001 debut and was renamed to International MV. In line with revisions to International Class 8 product lines, introduced a number of updates to the cab interior.  Externally distinguished by larger doors and side windows, the MV replaced the quarter windows of the DuraStar with a single-piece side window with a lower windowsill. The dashboard underwent extensive changes, with the previous instrument panel replaced by a reconfigurable digital display.

The International MV continues its use of Cummins diesel engines, with the Cummins B6.7 and L9 offered, depending on configuration.

Third generation (International MV; 2023–) 

The International MV was redesigned with a new front end for the 2023 model year

Variants 
The International DuraStar shares its cab design with several International product lines, including: the TerraStar Class 5 medium-duty truck, the 7000/WorkStar severe-service trucks (renamed the International HV), the 8000/TranStar regional-haul semitractor (renamed the International RH), the ProStar aerodynamic long-haul semi-tractor (renamed the International LT), and the LoneStar semitractor.

Bus

Like the 4000 series before it, the DuraStar serves as a popular platform for bus manufacturers, with two configurations sold for bus production.  The International 3200 is a cutaway-cab chassis; the International 3300 is a cowled chassis.  The former is sold primarily for commercial applications while the latter is sold nearly exclusively to Navistar subsidiary IC Bus, for both school bus and commercial applications.

Diesel–electric hybrid trucks
In 2007, Navistar International became the first American truck manufacturer to produce a diesel-electric truck, with the International DuraStar Hybrid.  International Truck and Engine teamed with the Hybrid Truck Users Forum (HTUF), a consortium of utility industry customers, Eaton Corporation, the US Federal Government and the Calstart organization to assist with the cost of bringing the technology to market. It also provided direct customer feedback and support.

Pickup truck 
From 2005 to 2008, International sold a factory-produced crew-cab pickup truck variant of the 4000 series.  Named the International RXT (RXT=Recreational Extreme Truck), at 272 inches long, the truck was the longest-length pickup truck ever produced.for sale in North America.  Unlike the 7000 series-derived CXT, the RXT was rear-wheel drive, marketed towards customers with large RV, boat, and horse trailers; both trucks source a pickup truck bed from the Ford F-350 Super Duty.  Derived from the 4200, the RXT was powered by a 230 hp VT365 V8 and an Allison 2200 transmission.

In 2008, following lower than expected sales, the XT series was withdrawn.

See also

Ford F-650/F-750 Super Duty - Ford medium-duty trucks produced by Blue Diamond Truck, LLC

References

External links
International Trucks
Maxxforce Engines

Navistar International buses
Navistar International trucks
Hybrid trucks
School bus chassis
Vehicles introduced in 2002
Class 5 trucks
Class 6 trucks
Class 7 trucks
Tractor units